Shahid Nawaz (born 3 March 1996) is a Pakistani cricketer. He made his first-class debut for Lahore Eagles in the 2014–15 Quaid-e-Azam Trophy on 12 October 2014.

References

External links
 

1996 births
Living people
Pakistani cricketers
Lahore Blues cricketers
Lahore Eagles cricketers
Cricketers from Faisalabad